Bryshere Yazuan Gray (born November 28, 1993), also known by the stage name Yazz the Greatest or simply Yazz, is an American actor and rapper, best known for his role as Hakeem Lyon in the Fox primetime musical drama television series Empire. He is also known for his portrayal as Michael Bivins in the 2017 BET miniseries The New Edition Story.

Career

Since 2013, Gray has performed at a variety of music festivals in the Philadelphia area, including Jay Z’s Made in America Festival, The Roots' Picnic Festival, and Power 99FM's Powerhouse concert. He also has been the opening act for rappers such as Fabolous and 2 Chainz. His debut single "Respect" was released in the same year. In 2015, Gray began his first acting role as Hakeem Lyon on the Fox drama TV series Empire, with co-stars Taraji P. Henson, Terrence Howard, and Jussie Smollett. In March 2015, it was confirmed that both Smollett and Gray had been signed on with Columbia Records as solo acts. In April 2016, Gray was cast alongside Elijah Kelley, Luke James, Algee Smith, Keith Powers and Woody McClain in the BET miniseries about R&B boy band, New Edition which debuted in January 2017. Gray signed on to portray co-founding member, Michael Bivins. In April 2018 Gray co starred with Teyana Taylor in Honey: Rise Up and Dance as Tyrell.

Personal life
Gray was born and raised in West Philadelphia. His mother, Andria Mayberry, became pregnant with him when she was a teenager, and in the absence of his father, he was raised by a single mother. When he was five years old, he was diagnosed with ADHD. Gray played football at Overbrook High School, but he switched to music after getting injured when he was 16 years old. He began to use his talent as a street performer to earn money and help his single mother afford their expenses. He also worked at Pizza Hut and then he used the money he made there to pay for and make his first music video before being fired for writing music at work. His efforts eventually led to a partnership with manager Charlie Mack. Gray told 'Cosmopolitan' in February, 2015, that his estranged father had reached out to him when he became popular, and that he needed time and needed to grow some more before taking any step in that regard. He has a sister named Brianna.

On July 13, 2020, Gray was arrested by police in Goodyear, Arizona following an alleged domestic violence incident with his wife that culminated in a barricade situation with police. Gray is facing charges of aggravated assault, domestic violence and disorderly conduct. Gray was charged and sentenced to 10 days in jail and 3 years probation following the attack on his wife on May 24, 2021.

Filmography

Discography

Singles
 " The Bottom

Awards and nominations

BET Awards
2018: Best Actor: Empire  (Nominated)

NAACP Image Awards
 2016 NAACP Image Awards: Outstanding Supporting Actor in a Drama Series: Empire (Nominated)
 2016: Outstanding New Artist (Nominated)

Teen Choice Awards
 2015: Choice TV: Breakout Star: Empire (Nominated)
 2015: Choice TV: Chemistry: Empire (Nominated)
 2015: Choice Music: Song From a Movie or TV Show: "You're So Beautiful" with Jussie Smollett (Nominated)

References

External links 

1993 births
African-American male actors
21st-century American male actors
American male television actors
African-American male rappers
Living people
21st-century American rappers
21st-century American male musicians
21st-century African-American musicians